Plecotus is a genus of vesper bat, commonly called long-eared bats. They are found throughout Eurasia and northern Africa. Many species in the genus have only been described and recognized in recent years.

Species

Genus Plecotus – long-eared bats

 Brown long-eared bat, Plecotus auritus
 Grey long-eared bat, Plecotus austriacus
 Ethiopian long-eared bat, Plecotus balensis
 Christie's long-eared bat, Plecotus christii
 Gaisler's long-eared bat, Plecotus gaisleri
 Himalayan long-eared bat, Plecotus homochrous
 Mediterranean long-eared bat, Plecotus kolombatovici
 Kozlov's long-eared bat, Plecotus kozlovi
 Alpine long-eared bat, Plecotus macrobullaris
 Ognev's long-eared bat Plecotus ognevi
 Japanese long-eared bat, Plecotus sacrimontis
 Sardinian long-eared bat, Plecotus sardus
 Strelkov's long-eared bat, Plecotus strelkovi
 Taiwan long-eared bat, Plecotus taivanus
 Canary long-eared bat, Plecotus teneriffae
 Turkmen long-eared bat, Plecotus turkmenicus
 Ward's long-eared bat, Plecotus wardi

References

 
 www.funet.fi

 
Taxa named by Étienne Geoffroy Saint-Hilaire
Bat genera